The Agricultural Wheel was a cooperative alliance of farmers in the United States. It was established in 1882 in Arkansas.  A major founding organizers of the Agricultural Wheel was W. W. Tedford, an Arkansas farmer and school teacher. Like similar farmer organizations such as the Southern Farmers' Alliance, the Louisiana Farmers' Union. and the Brothers of Freedom, the Agricultural Wheel had been formed to expose and correct the injustices and oppressions done to the small farmers by merchants, grain elevators and the railroads. The Wheel promoted a radical agenda including currency expansion through free silver; closing all national banks; regulation or nationalization of the railroads, the telephones and the telegraph; allow only Americans to purchase public lands; impose an income tax on high incomes; and elect senators by popular election instead of by state legislatures. The Wheel encouraged farmers to join local cooperatives, avoid the debt cycle, and avoid one crop overemphasis on cotton.

History
On February 15, 1882, during a period of depressed farm prices and drought, a group of nine Arkansas farmers led by W. W. Tedford, W. A. Suit and W. Taylor McBee met at the McBee Schoolhouse eight miles south of Des Arc in Prairie County in eastern Arkansas and formed the Wattensas Farmers' Club. The club vowed to improve the lives of farmers, improve their education and knowledge, and improve communications between them. Many Arkansas farmers were suffering under what they viewed as oppressive mortgages (known as anaconda mortgages) and were heavily in debt.

Within a short time it was suggested that the organization change its name. The choices were between "The Poor Man's Friend" and "The Agricultural Wheel" which was the name finally selected.

The situation did not improve in Arkansas that year and farmers were in such desperate straits that they called upon Governor Churchill to ask the legislature to postpone the collection of taxes.

By 1883 the organization consisted of over 500 members in Arkansas. At the organization's meeting in the spring a state Wheel was established and deputies were appointed to spread the word to neighboring states and seek to establish local wheels in those states.

In October 1885 the Wheel absorbed, by a vote of both organizations, the Brothers of Freedom, another Arkansas farm organization.  In July 1886, the merger of the two farm organizations became official.  

In 1886 delegates from Arkansas, Kentucky and Tennessee gathered at the town of Litchfield, Arkansas, to establish the National Agricultural Wheel and an official newspaper for the organization.

By the time of the 1887 meeting, the membership of the national organization was over 500,000 farmers from Arkansas, Tennessee, Kentucky, Mississippi, Missouri, Indian Territory, and Wisconsin. 

The growing political clout of the organization led it to promulgate a platform consisting of the following demands: 

 Paying off the national debt
 Repeal of laws that favored capital over labor
 Preventing aliens from owning land
 Abolishing national banks
 Government operations on a cash basis
 Ending of agricultural futures trading
 Establishing a graduated income tax
 Prohibiting importation of foreign labor
 National ownership of transportation and communication
 Direct election of national politicians
 Free trade and removal of all import duties
 Establishment of a luxury tax
 Free public education
 No renewal of patents

In 1888 at the national meeting in Meridian, Mississippi a merger between the Wheel and the Farmers' Alliance was proposed. The two organizations met jointly in 1889 in Birmingham, Alabama and merged that same year.

Among farmers' organizations of the period the Wheel was remarkable for refusal to hold racially segregated meetings, a policy it held until merger with the Farmers' Alliance.

Merger
Centered largely in the state of Arkansas the Agricultural Wheel sought association with other farm protest organizations outside the state.  Merger talks had begun as early as 1887 between these protest groups.  Besides the similarity of their political goals the Agricultural Wheel and the other farm protest organization shared the same organizational structure.  The Agricultural Wheel and the other farm protest organizations anticipating merger were organized on the basis of small clubs of farmers organized at the neighborhood level.  Even organization at the county level had proved to be impractical.  County level organization was too large and not "local enough."  In the 1880s, small farmers rarely journeyed to the county seat of their home counties.  The Agricultural Wheel continued to exist as a separate organization until 1889 when it merged with the National Farmers' Alliance to form the Farmers' and Laborers' Union of America.

Historian Theodore Saloutos wrote that:
 the Agricultural Wheel was a protest  against the effects of the Civil War and Reconstruction, the difficulties of a pioneer, primitive, sparsely-settled community attempting to adapt itself to a small-scale commercialized state of agriculture, the effects of one-crop farming, the share and crop-lean systems, lawlessness, and corruption in "high places."

See also 
 The Wheel Store: Cooperative store on the NRHP
 Wheel, Tennessee: Named after the organization

References

Further reading
 Garland Bayliss, "Public Affairs in Arkansas, 1874–1896." Ph.D. dissertation, University of Texas at Austin, 1972
 Elkins, F. Clark. "State Politics and the Agricultural Wheel." Arkansas Historical Quarterly 38.3 (1979): 248-258. Online
 Elkins, F. Clark. "The Agricultural Wheel: County Politics and Consolidation, 1884-1885." Arkansas Historical Quarterly 29.2 (1970): 152-175. Online
 Saloutos, Theodore. "The Agricultural Wheel in Arkansas." Arkansas Historical Quarterly 2.2 (1943): 127-140.  Online

External links 
 Agricultural Wheel from the Encyclopedia of Arkansas History and Culture
 Agricultural Wheel from the Tennessee Encyclopedia of History and Culture

History of Arkansas
Agriculture and forestry trade unions in the United States
History of agriculture in the United States
1882 establishments in Arkansas
Agricultural organizations based in the United States
Agriculture in Arkansas
Organizations established in 1882